Shwe Thamee is a Burmese actress and model . She is one of the most successful actresses in Myanmar. Throughout her career, she has acted in over 50 films.

Filmography

Film (Cinema)

References 

1993 births
Living people
Burmese film actresses
Burmese female models
People from Mandalay
21st-century Burmese actresses